Saeid Fazloula (born 9 August 1992) is an Iranian canoeist. He competed in the men's K-1 1000 metres event at the 2020 Summer Olympics, representing the Refugee Olympic Team. 

In 2015, after he received some threats, Fazloula decided to flee his country to find a more secure place. He is now training and living in Germany. His sport, his club, his coach and his training group helped him to settle and start a new life.

References

External links
 

1992 births
Living people
Iranian male canoeists
Refugee Olympic Team at the 2020 Summer Olympics
Canoeists at the 2020 Summer Olympics
Place of birth missing (living people)
Asian Games medalists in canoeing
Canoeists at the 2014 Asian Games
Medalists at the 2014 Asian Games
Asian Games silver medalists for Iran